Polish-Jewish Studies is an annual, peer-reviewed journal which is published by the Institute of National Remembrance since 2020, focused on Polish-Jewish history.

History 
The journal's Editor-in-Chief is Grzegorz Berendt. Marek Jan Chodakiewicz, a right-wing Polish-American historian who has been widely accused of anti-semitism, is among its consulting editors.

Reception 
Kornelia Kończal, a historian at Bielefeld University, found the total absence of scholars from the Polish Center for Holocaust Research or the many centers for Jewish studies across Polish universities in the editorial board conspicuous; she held the journal as part of a statist repertoire to whitewash the Polish complicity with the Nazi regime. Joanna Tokarska-Bakir, chair of the Institute of Slavic Studies at the Polish Academy of Sciences, notes Berendt, Chodakiewicz, and others associated with the journal to have engaged in controversial speech on Jews; she exclaimed that even to enquire whether the journal had any meaningful peer-review process was a rhetorical exercise.

References 

European history journals
Polish-language journals
Magazines published in Warsaw
Publications established in 2020
2020 establishments in Poland
Jews and Judaism in Warsaw
Academic journals published in Poland